Franco Giacobini (5 March 1926 – 27 December 2015) was an Italian actor.

Born in Rome as Francesco Giacobini, he graduated at Accademia Nazionale di Arte Drammatica Silvio D'Amico in 1948, then started a prolific stage career, working in comedy plays, dramas and revues. Giacobini also appeared in numerous films and TV-works, usually in comedic roles. He was married to actress Angela Goodwin.

Selected filmography  

 Papà diventa mamma (1952) - Il passeggero sul Tram
 Le marchand de Venise (1953)
 Ci troviamo in galleria (1953) - Funzionario RAI
 Via Padova 46 (1953) - The Journalist (uncredited)
 Caporale di giornata (1958) - The Sailor on the Telephone (uncredited)
 La cento chilometri (1959) - The Race Walker without His Underpants
 Uncle Was a Vampire (1959) - Il secondo play boy
 The Employee (1960) - Rotondi
 Run with the Devil (1960) - The TV Interviewer (uncredited)
 The Fascist (1961) - Militare a Rocca Sabina
 The Orderly (1961)
 Hercules in the Haunted World (1961) - Telemachus (Telemaco)
 Cronache del '22 (1961)
 Erik the Conqueror (1961) - Rustichello
 A cavallo della tigre (1961) - Medico del carcere
 The Two Marshals (1961) - Basilio Meneghetti
 His Women (1961) - The Police Commissioner
 Il mio amico Benito (1962) - Liberati
 Crazy Desire (1962) - Alberghetti
 Totò Diabolicus (1962) - Dottor Santoro
 La bellezza di Ippolita (1962) - Aurelio
 Eighteen in the Sun (1962) - Commissar
 Lo smemorato di Collegno (1962) - Giornalista
 Le Scorpion (1962)
 I motorizzati (1962) - Alberto
 Sherlock Holmes and the Deadly Necklace (1962) - Texas Collector
 The Shortest Day (1963) - (uncredited)
 Uno strano tipo (1963) - Journalist
 Sexy Toto (1963) - Un galeotti
 The Swindlers (1963) - The Lawyer Ovidio (segment "Società calcistica, La")
 Gli onorevoli (1963) - De Angelis
 La ballata dei mariti (1963) - Vicebrigadiere Licata
 Senza sole né luna (1964)
 I Kill, You Kill (1965) - Dottore (segment "Una boccata di fumo")
 Soldati e caporali (1965) - Serg. Pancani
 Assassination in Rome (1965)
 Two Sergeants of General Custer (1965) - Cochise
 Le sedicenni (1965)
 El Greco (1966) - Francisco
 Zärtliche Haie (1967) - Fähnrich
 O.K. Connery (1967) - Juan
 I 2 vigili (1967) - Romoletto
 Soldati e capelloni (1967) - Franco - il barbiere
 Quarta parete (1968)
 Donne... botte e bersaglieri (1968) - Marshal
 Don Chisciotte and Sancio Panza (1968) - Don Nicola - barber
 Sissignore (1968) - Facchetti
 The Mercenary (1968) - Pepote
 Chimera (1968) - Sergeant
 Alibi (1969) - Luca
 Why Did I Ever Say Yes Twice? (1969) - Roberto
 Terzo Canale - Avventura a Montecarlo (1970) - Mechanic
 Mazzabubù... Quante corna stanno quaggiù? (1971) - Boemondo
 It Can Be Done Amigo (1972) - L'uomo chi mangia la terra
 Sonny and Jed (1972) - Aparicito
 Abbasso tutti, viva noi (1974) - Teacher
 The Student Connection (1974) - Chief Inspector Delon
 Il gatto mammone (1975) - Priest
  (1976) - Maresciallo delle Carabinieri (uncredited)
 Three Tigers Against Three Tigers (1977) - Servant of Di Lazzaro
 Pane, burro e marmellata (1977) - Simona's Husband
 I'm Getting a Yacht (1980) - Fugitive #1
 Sing Sing (1983) - Baron Orfeo della Torre (first story)
 Scrivilo sui muri (2007) - Anziano
 Il volto di un'altra (2012) - Proprietario del negozio di animali impagliati

References 

 Notice of death

External links 
 

Italian male film actors
1926 births
Male actors from Rome
Italian male television actors
Italian male stage actors
2015 deaths
Accademia Nazionale di Arte Drammatica Silvio D'Amico alumni